The 1996 Big 12 Conference softball tournament was held at ASA Hall of Fame Stadium in Oklahoma City, OK from May 10 through May 11, 1996. Oklahoma won their first conference tournament and earned the Big 12 Conference's automatic bid to the 1996 NCAA Division I softball tournament. 

Schedule
Source:

All-Tournament Team
Source:

References

Big 12 Conference softball tournament
Tournament
Big 12 softball tournament